The men's 65 kg competition in judo at the 1988 Summer Olympics in Seoul was held on 26 September at the Jangchung Gymnasium. The gold medal was won by Lee Kyung-keun of South Korea.

Results

Pool A

Pool B

Repechages

Final

Final classification

References

Judo at the 1988 Summer Olympics
Judo at the Summer Olympics Men's Half Lightweight
Men's events at the 1988 Summer Olympics